Hamed Ali (born 12 January 1956) is a Saudi Arabian sprinter. He competed in the men's 200 metres at the 1976 Summer Olympics.

References

External links

1956 births
Living people
Athletes (track and field) at the 1976 Summer Olympics
Saudi Arabian male sprinters
Olympic athletes of Saudi Arabia
Place of birth missing (living people)